Infinity Drips is the thirty-fourth studio album by Omar Rodríguez-López as a solo artist, released on 21 October 2016. It is his eighth release in the 12 album series initiated by Ipecac Recordings.

"Zuben El Genubi" was uploaded in advance as the album's single.

Background
Infinity Drips shares its name with a piece of artwork created by Omar's longtime artistic collaborator Sonny Kay. It appeared in the booklet for the compilation album Telesterion, so it was assumed that the piece would become cover art for a future release by Rodriguez-Lopez. The album however features a different artwork made by Elyn Kazarian, while Kay's artwork went on to be used for Anywhere's album Anywhere II in 2018.

The album has Middle Eastern aesthetic and diverse instrumentation. Teri Gender Bender talked about the album in an interview with The Seventh Hex regarding Bosnian Rainbows in 2015:
"My mother loves Indian music, so when I was little I had the fortune of being in an environment of spices and Middle Eastern music. Omar and I worked on an album where it’s just Indian [sic] music, samples turned into neatly crafted hymns with some Spanish lyrics, some others are English lyrics… At the end of the day it’s always great to try new things for one self. Who knows, maybe someday we’ll release it."

Some of the musical fragments also appear in various other recordings by Rodriguez-Lopez. "Azha" appears in "Happiness" from Unicorn Skeleton Mask and the first three tracks off Zapopan, "Edasich" in "Suenos Salvajes" from Equinox, and "Healed and Raised by Wounds" off Nom de Guerre Cabal, and "Manir al Shuja" in "Ocho" from Un Corazon de Nadie. All track titles are Arabic names for stars.

Track listing

 "Na'ir Al Saif" – 1:05
 "Azha" – 1:43
 "Jabhat Al Akrab" – 1:26
 "Microscopium" – 1:16
 "Tania Borealis" – 2:24
 "Lacerta" – 4:51
 "Zuben El Genubi" – 3:08
 "El Nath" – 1:51
 "Nihal" – 4:50
 "Baten Kaitos" – 1:48
 "Edasich" – 3:38
 "Er Rai" – 1:48
 "Manir Al Shuja" – 4:23

Personnel
 Teri Gender Bender – vocals, lyrics
 Omar Rodríguez-López – instruments, samples

Production
 Jon Debaun – recording, mixing
 Shawn Sullivan – recording
 Chris Common – mastering
 Elyn Kazarian – artwork

Release history

References

2016 albums
Omar Rodríguez-López albums